Ephraim Kishon (: August 23, 1924 – January 29, 2005) was a Hungarian-born Israeli author, dramatist, screenwriter, and Oscar-nominated film director. He was one of the most widely read contemporary satirists in Israel, and was also particularly popular in German-speaking countries.

Biography 
Ephraim Kishon was born on August 23, 1924, by the name of Ferenc Hoffmann into a middle-class Jewish family in Budapest, Hungary. In his youth he knew neither Hebrew nor Yiddish. His father worked as a bank manager and his mother was a former secretary. Kishon also had a sister who was a writer.

His writing talent became evident in his youth. In 1940 he won his first prize for writing a novel for high school students. Due to the racial laws applied in Hungary during World War II, he was not allowed to continue his studies at the university and therefore he began to study jewelry making in 1942.

During World War II the Nazis imprisoned him in several concentration camps. At one camp his chess talent helped him survive, as he played chess with the guards. In another camp, the Germans lined up the inmates and shot every tenth person, but passed him by. He later wrote in his book The Scapegoat, "They made a mistake—they left one satirist alive". He eventually managed to escape the concentration camps while being transported to the Sobibor extermination camp in Nazi German Occupied Poland, and hid the remainder of the war disguised as "Stanko Andras", a Slovak laborer.

After the war when he returned to Budapest he discovered that his parents and sister had survived, but many other family members had been murdered in the gas chambers at Auschwitz. In 1945, he changed his surname from Hoffmann to Kishont and returned to Hungary, where he continued to study art and writing. In 1948 he completed his studies in metal sculpturing and art history and began publishing humorous articles under the name Franz Kishunt.

In 1949 he immigrated to the newly founded state of Israel, together with his first wife Eva (Chawa) Klamer, to escape the Communist regime. When arriving in Israel an immigration officer officially Hebraicized his name to "Ephraim Kishon". According to Kishon, the Jewish Agency clerk asked him for his name and when he answered "Ferenc" the clerk said: There is no such thing, and wrote "Ephraim", and afterwards he went ahead and Hebraicized his family name as well, Kishon being a river near Haifa, the Israeli city on  Mount Carmel.

His first marriage to Eva (Chawa) Klamer in 1946 ended in divorce. In 1959, he married Sara (née Lipovitz), who died in 2002. In 2003, he married the Austrian writer Lisa Witasek. Kishon had three children: Raphael (b. 1957), Amir (b. 1963), and Renana (b. 1968).

In 1981, Kishon established a second home in the rural Swiss canton of Appenzell after feeling unappreciated in Israel, but remained a staunch Zionist.

Kishon died on January 29, 2005, at his home in Switzerland at the age of 80 following a cardiac arrest. His body was flown to Israel and he was buried at the Trumpeldor Cemetery in Tel Aviv.

Being a popular Israeli writer, he still felt he was getting negative treatment from the Israeli media due to the fact he was rather right wing in his political views.

Literary career
Kishon initially lived in the "Sha'ar Ha'Aliyah" transit camp near Haifa, and soon afterwards moved to Kibbutz Kfar Hahoresh, in which he worked as a nurse while learning the Hebrew language during his free time with the help of his neighbor Joseph Bilitzer. During this period he wrote several humorous lists for the Hungarian newspaper "Új Kelet". Afterwards Kishon moved to a housing project. He studied Hebrew at the Ulpan "Etzion" in Jerusalem, and soon became proficient in the language. Nevertheless, his heavy Hungarian accent accompanied him throughout his life.

Mastering the Hebrew language with remarkable speed, in 1951 Kishon began writing a satirical column in the easy-Hebrew daily, Omer, after only two years in the country. Later on Kishon began writing for the newspaper "Davar" (which was very influential at the time) in which he published a satire called "The Blaumilch Canal". That same year he published his first book in Israel "Ha-ole Ha-Yored le-Chayenu"- "The Pestering Immigrant", (a pun on the Hebrew word for "Immigrant") which was written in Hungarian and translated into Hebrew by Avigdor Hameiri. The book was mostly about the life experiences of new immigrants in Israel during the 1950s.

In 1952 Kishon began writing a regular satirical column called "Had Gadya" ("One Young Goat" in Aramaic, taken from the Passover Seder liturgy) in the daily Hebrew tabloid "Ma'ariv". Kishon kept writing the column for about 30 years, while in the first two decades he published a new column almost every day. Within a few years after launching his writing career in Israel Kishon became one of the most prominent humorists and satirists in the country.

Kishon's extraordinary linguistic inventiveness and flair for creating characters was carried over into his work for the theater. Collections of his humorous writings have appeared in Hebrew and in translation. Among the English translations are Look Back Mrs. Lot (1960), Noah's Ark, Tourist Class (1962), The Seasick Whale (1965), and two books on the Six-Day War and its aftermath, So Sorry We Won (1967), and Woe to the Victors (1969). Two collections of his plays have also appeared in Hebrew: Shemo Holekh Lefanav (1953) and Ma´arkhonim (1959).

Kishon's books have been translated into 37 languages and sold particularly well in  Germany. Kishon rejected the idea of universal guilt for the Holocaust. He said: “It gives me great satisfaction to see the grandchildren of my executioners queuing up to buy my books.” Until his death in 1979, Friedrich Torberg translated his work into German. Thereafter Kishon did the German translations himself.

Chess 

Kishon was a lifelong chess enthusiast, and took an early interest in chess-playing computers. In 1990, German chess computer manufacturer Hegener & Glaser together with Fidelity produced the Kishon Chesster, a chess computer distinguished by the spoken comments it would make during a game. Kishon wrote the comments to be humorous, but were also carefully chosen to be relevant to chess and the position in the game.

Published works

Books

 
 Ha-ole Ha-Yored le-Chayenu (1951)
 Thousand of Gadia and Gadia (1954)
 Ein Kamonim (1955)
 Do not worry (1957)
 Skeches (1959)
 It all depends (1958)
 Be-Echad Ha-Emeshim  (1961)
 He and She (1963)
 Somersaults (1964)
 Bone in the throat (1966)
 So sorry we won! (1967) (with illustrations by Dosh)
 Gomzim Gomzim (1969)
 For (1970)
 Oh, winners (1970)
 Department of Ephraim Kishon (1972)
 Wole in the screen (1973)
 Partachia my love (1974)
 My Family Right or Wrong (1977)
 Smile drought (1978)
 Family Book (1980–current)
 Jonathan voyage (1981) children books
 The cup is ours (1981) children books
 Uncles on the wires (1981) children books
 Unfinished adventure (1981) children books
 Gum with stripes (1981) children books
 Seven Comedies (1981)
 Satire book I (1981)
 Arbinkea (1991)
 Satire book II (1991)
 Satire book III (1992)
 58 Skeches (1995)
 Ants war (1995) children books
 Hercules and the seven midgets (1995) children books
 The Taming of the Shrew dog (1995) children books
 Hairy, hell (1998)
 state protocol (1999)
 The Redhead with the Key (2002) children books
 Book of Travels (2003)
 Partachia (2004)
 Picasso's Sweet Revenge (2004)

Plays

 His reputation precedes him (1953)
 Black on White (1957)
 Ha-Ketubbah (1959)
 No word to Morgenstein (1960)
 Take the plug out (1968)
 Oh, oh, Juliet (1972)
 Salah Shabati the musical  (1988)
 Open for renovation  (2004) not yet seen
 The Policeman (2009)
 

Kishon's sketches and plays have been performed, in translation, on stages and television networks worldwide.

Films 
Kishon expanded into cinema in the early 1960s. He wrote, directed and produced five feature films (all of them comedic /satirical movies). Three movies were nominated for major international awards (The Golden Globe award), two were nominated for the Oscar:
 Sallah Shabati (1964), nominated for Oscar for best foreign language film), Israeli comedy film about the chaos of Israeli immigration and resettlement. This social satire placed the director Ephraim Kishon among the first Israeli filmmakers to achieve international success. It also introduced actor Chaim Topol (Fiddler on the Roof) to audiences worldwide.
 Ervinka (1967), written and directed by Kishon. The film, starring Topol, is a comical tale of a con man who falls in love with a police officer.
 Blaumilch Canal, also known as The Big Dig (1969, nominated for Golden Globe 1971), an Israeli comedy which depicts the madness of bureaucracy through a municipality's reaction to the actions of a lunatic.
 Ha-Shoter Azoulay (literally, Constable Azoulay), also known as The Policeman (1971, nominated for Oscar for best foreign language film, awarded 1972 Golden Globe for best foreign language film). It won several other awards, such as best foreign film in the Barcelona film festival and best director in the Monte Carlo festival. In Israel it is considered a cinematic classic.
  The Fox in the Chicken Coop (1978), based on Kishon's satirical book by the same name (Hebrew: Ha Shu'al B'Lool HaTarnegolot), features many prominent Israeli actors of the time, most notably Shaike Ophir and Seffy Rivlin. The film takes a satirical, comic look at the old generation of Israeli politicians.

Awards
 In 1953, Kishon won the Nordau Prize for Literature;
 In 1958, he won the Sokolov Prize for Journalism;
 In 1964, he won the Kinor David Prize;
 In 1998, he was the co-recipient (jointly with Nurit Guvrin and Aryeh Sivan) of the Bialik Prize for literature;
 In 2002, he was awarded the Israel Prize for lifetime achievement & special contribution to society and the State of Israel. Upon receiving the prize, he remarked: "I've won the Israel Prize, even though I'm pro-Israel. It's almost like a state pardon. They usually give it to one of those liberals who love the Palestinians and hate the settlers."

Kishon was nominated twice for an Academy Award for Best Foreign Language Film and three times for a Golden Globe Award. He won two Golden Globe Best Foreign Language Film Awards, for Sallah Shabati (1964), and The Policeman (1971).

See also
List of Bialik Prize recipients
List of Israel Prize recipients
Golden Globe Award for Best Foreign Language Film#1960s.

References

External links 

Ephraim Kishon: Official website 
Ephraim Kishon at Israeli Dramatists Website
Ephraim Kishon – Biography, Satires, Obituaries, Photos, Prizes
Ephraim Kishon Obituary, [London], The Times, February 2, 2005
Lives Remembered Comments by Irene Lancaster  and Victor Ross on the Times obituary. [London], The Times, [February 8, 2005]
The funniest man in the world: the wild and crazy humor of Ephraim Kishon at Internet Archive. 1989 New York, Shapolsky Publishers; London, Prion  

1924 births
2005 deaths
Hungarian Jews
Hungarian writers
Holocaust survivors
Hungarian emigrants to Israel
Israel Prize for lifetime achievement & special contribution to society recipients
Israeli male dramatists and playwrights
Israeli expatriates in Switzerland
Israeli film directors
Israeli humorists
Israeli Jews
Israeli male screenwriters
Israeli people of Hungarian-Jewish descent
Israeli satirists
Jewish dramatists and playwrights
Jewish concentration camp survivors
Jewish escapees from Nazi concentration camps
Officers Crosses of the Order of Merit of the Federal Republic of Germany
20th-century Israeli dramatists and playwrights
Maariv (newspaper) people
20th-century screenwriters
Burials at Trumpeldor Cemetery